"Abyssinia, Henry" is the 72nd episode of the M*A*S*H television series, and the final episode of the series' third season. It was written by Everett Greenbaum and Jim Fritzell, and first aired on March 18, 1975. The episode is notable for its shocking ending, in which the unit's amiable commanding officer Lieutenant Colonel Henry Blake (played by McLean Stevenson) receives an honorable discharge and leaves for home, but in the final scene is reported killed by enemy fire. This ending prompted more than 1,000 letters to series producers Gene Reynolds and Larry Gelbart, and drew fire from both CBS and 20th Century Fox.

The title of the episode refers to the 1920s–1930s slang use of "Abyssinia" for "goodbye". ("Abyssinia", pronounced "ab-ee-SIN-ee-ah" can be understood as "I'll be seeing you".)

After the production of this episode, both Stevenson and Wayne Rogers, who played the character of Trapper John McIntyre, left the series to pursue other interests. While Stevenson's departure was announced prior to and written into "Abyssinia, Henry", Rogers unexpectedly left the series during the break between seasons, and so his character's departure takes place off-screen in the following episode, "Welcome to Korea", the first of the show's fourth season. These combined departures and their subsequent cast replacements also signaled the beginning of a shift in focus of the M*A*S*H series as a whole, with a greater focus on the character of Hawkeye Pierce, played by Alan Alda.

Plot
The episode opens with a typical operating room scene; Radar O'Reilly (Gary Burghoff) enters and informs Henry Blake that Blake has received all of the needed Army service points to be discharged and sent home. Henry begins planning his return and places a telephone call to Bloomington, Illinois to inform his wife and family of the good news.

Majors Margaret Houlihan (Loretta Swit) and Frank Burns (Larry Linville) celebrate privately that Frank will become the unit commander. Henry and Radar share a sentimental moment in which young Radar describes Henry as a father figure, and gives Henry an inscribed Winchester cartridge; a surprised Henry returns the favor by spontaneously giving Radar a rectal thermometer that once belonged to his father. On the night before Henry's departure, Hawkeye Pierce (Alan Alda), Trapper McIntyre (Wayne Rogers), and Radar throw a drunken going-away party for Henry at Rosie's Bar and Grill, and present him with a tailored civilian suit as a parting gift.

The next morning, Frank attempts to assemble the company for a formal send-off, but Hawkeye and Trapper are out of uniform and unshaven, and Corporal Klinger (Jamie Farr) wears a particularly elaborate dress made specially for the occasion. Henry arrives in his new suit, and Frank and Margaret give Blake a formal salute, but Henry chides Frank for being too disciplined. Henry's affectionate individual goodbyes to the others are cut short by the imminent arrival of his helicopter, but Hawkeye pulls him aside and persuades him to give a long parting kiss to Margaret, to her surprise and Frank's annoyance.

The staff follow Henry to the helicopter pad, which also bears a wounded soldier that Henry tries to care for before the other doctors nudge him on. Henry spots an emotional Radar saluting him and approaches to return the salute, hug him, and chide him like a loving father to behave himself, before boarding and flying away.

Towards the end of the episode, in another typical operating-room scene, Radar enters, visibly shaken. Trapper and Hawkeye make joking comments, but Radar announces, "I have a message. Lieutenant Colonel Henry Blake's plane was shot down over the Sea of Japan. It spun in. There were no survivors." Radar then leaves the operating room as the camera pans across the stunned staff, each visibly fighting to retain composure and continue with their work.

After a commercial break, the episode closes with a "reluctant and affectionate farewell" to Blake by means of a light-hearted montage of clips from past episodes.

Production

The final scene, in which Radar informs the 4077th of the death of Henry Blake, was unprecedented: it was the first time in American television history that a main character departing a comedy series was killed off in a tragic way. When Stevenson decided to leave the series partway through the third season, producers Gene Reynolds and Larry Gelbart decided to make a statement regarding the unexpectancies and horror of war, especially with the Vietnam War fresh in viewers' minds.

To evoke genuine emotions of shock and sadness, the final O.R. scene was kept a secret from the cast until immediately before filming; only then did Gelbart hand out the last page of the script. As a result, Stevenson was still on the set and saw the final scene being filmed. After shooting was completed, a season-ending cast party was planned. Stevenson left the set almost immediately after the end of filming, and the party was canceled due to the dour mood of the cast. Stevenson later said in an interview that he was deeply hurt that his character's death was revealed in this fashion and the party was "ruined". Gelbart later said of the event, "I wish we could say to him, 'We didn't mean it, Mac.

Reaction and impact

Certain journalists revealed Blake's fate in the weeks leading up to the episode's broadcast. The Chicago Tribune'''s Gary Deeb, for instance, revealed Blake's death nearly two months before the episode aired. Still, shortly after the episode originally aired, the reactions and feedback of viewers were intense, both in support and condemnation of the events of the episode. It is estimated that over 1,000 letters were received by the producers regarding the episode; "some ... were from people who understood. Many were from people that didn't." Many of those who objected also cited the fact that M*A*S*H was considered a situation comedy, and that Blake's "cheap" killing did not belong in the show; one caller to Reynolds stated after the episode aired that they "don't know why [they] did it; it's not necessary, it's just a little comedy show" and that "you've upset everybody [in the family]," before vowing never to watch the show again. Another, more lighthearted response to the episode came from an unhappy viewer in Lubbock, Texas, who sent a telegram stating that "Henry Blake has been found in a raft in Lake Lubbock." Initially, Gelbart and Reynolds hand-wrote letters in response to the feedback, but eventually, due to the overwhelming number of letters, a form response was created explaining the rationale of their decisions. Negative reactions were not exclusive to the home viewers of the program: both CBS, the network that aired M*A*S*H, and 20th Century Fox, the company that produced M*A*S*H, expressed their unhappiness at the killing of Henry Blake. In fact, CBS's distaste with the episode was so great that during a later rerun of the episode, the final O.R. scene was cut from the episode. The final scenes have always been shown in syndication, and were uncut on the DVD release of the series' third season in 2003.

Not all reaction to the airing was negative. On an episode of the variety series Cher that aired shortly afterward and featured Stevenson as a guest, the situation was parodied when the episode opened to a studio shot of Stevenson as Blake floating on a smoking raft and shouting, "I'm OK! I'm OK!"

In Bobbie Ann Mason's 1985 novel In Country, the teenage protagonist recalls having watched the episode as a child and being "so shocked she went around stunned for days," and confesses that Blake's death on the show had seemed more real to her than the death of her own father in Vietnam.

The final scene was spoofed on the Family Guy episode "Fifteen Minutes of Shame" when a cutaway shows Brian Griffin saying to the rest of the family, "I have an announcement. Meg Griffin's plane was shot down over the Sea of Japan. It spun in. There were no survivors."

In 1997, TV Guide'' included this episode in their list of the "100 Greatest Episodes of All Time," ranking it number 20.

In 2005, TV Land included this episode as part of its "Top 100 Most Unexpected Moments in TV History", ranking it number 15.

Aftermath

While "Abyssinia, Henry" is well known for the departure of McLean Stevenson from the series, it was also the final episode in which Wayne Rogers appeared. During the summer 1975 break between seasons three and four, he quit the series. 20th Century Fox sued him for breach of contract, but the lawsuit collapsed. The character of Trapper John McIntyre was subsequently written off the series in "Welcome to Korea," the first episode of the next season.

As a result, when the cast returned to begin filming the series' fourth season in September 1975, there were major changes in both the makeup and the direction of the show. The more earnest and faithful family man Captain B.J. Hunnicutt (Mike Farrell) had replaced Trapper John, and the regular Army Colonel Sherman Potter (Harry Morgan) had replaced Henry Blake as commander of the 4077th. Longtime recurring guest cast member Jamie Farr, who played Corporal Maxwell Q. Klinger, was elevated to the regular cast, with his name being featured on the opening credits. Episodes following this represented a major change in focus for the show; the individual effects and psychological damages of war were explored more, often in parallel to the ending of the Vietnam War, and the Korean culture was portrayed in greater depth than had been done before, instead of focusing on a "boorish, military mindset" as before.

In general, the show began to take on a more serious tone as a seriocomic (or dramedy) series, in which the focus was on the character rather than the character type, and moved away from its status as a situation comedy.

References

External links

 
 

1975 American television episodes
M*A*S*H (season 3) episodes
Television episodes about death